Paul Daniel Brunton (born August 19, 1944 in Negritos, Peru) is an American politician and lawyer from Oklahoma.

Education & military service
He graduated from Cascia Hall Preparatory School in Tulsa, Oklahoma in 1962.

Brunton participated in the Reserve Officers' Training Corps for two years while studying Asian history at the University of Oklahoma. He joined the Special Forces upon graduation in 1966. He served in the Vietnam War, and obtained early release to attend the University of Tulsa College of Law, from which he graduated in 1971. Brunton earned a master of laws degree from the University of Arkansas School of Law in 1982.

Legal & political career
Brunton then worked as a public defender in Tulsa County between 1972 and 1974. He was a member of the Oklahoma House of Representatives from 1975 to 1981, succeeding Frank Keating. Since stepping down from the state legislature, he has run a private legal practice in Tulsa.

From 2006 to 2008, he served as a member of the Oklahoma Sentencing Commission.

Personal life
He was married to Sheila R. Bryant from 1982 until her death in 2018.

References

1944 births
Living people
United States Army personnel of the Vietnam War
United States Army officers
21st-century American lawyers
20th-century American lawyers
Oklahoma lawyers
Republican Party members of the Oklahoma House of Representatives
20th-century Members of the Oklahoma House of Representatives
University of Arkansas School of Law alumni
University of Oklahoma alumni
University of Tulsa College of Law alumni
Politicians from Tulsa, Oklahoma
Public defenders